Robert Takeo Matsui (September 17, 1941 – January 1, 2005) was an American politician from the state of California. Matsui was a member of the Democratic Party and served in the U.S. House of Representatives as the congressman for California's 5th congressional district from 1979 until his death at the end of his 13th term.

The Robert T. Matsui United States Courthouse in Sacramento is named in his honor.

Early life and education
A third-generation Japanese American, Matsui was born in Sacramento, California, and was six months old when he and his family were taken from Sacramento and interned by the U.S. government at the Tule Lake War Relocation Center in 1942.

Matsui graduated from the University of California, Berkeley in 1963 with a BA in political science, and then from the Hastings College of Law in 1966. He founded his own Sacramento law practice in 1967.

Political career

In 1971, Matsui was elected to the Sacramento City Council. He won re-election in 1975 and became vice mayor of the city in 1977.

In 1978, Matsui ran for the Democratic nomination in what was then the 3rd District after 12-term incumbent John E. Moss announced his retirement. He won a five-way Democratic primary with 36 percent of the vote, besting a field that included State Assemblyman Eugene Gualco and Sacramento Mayor Phil Isenberg.

He defeated Republican Sandy Smolley with 53 percent of the vote. He would never face another contest nearly that close in what has long been the most Democratic district in interior California, and would be reelected 13 times. After his initial contest, he never dropped below 68 percent of the vote. He was reelected in 1982 with no major-party opposition, and was unopposed in 1984. His district was renumbered as the 5th District after the 1990 Census.

In 1988, Matsui succeeded in helping pass the Civil Liberties Act of 1988, which produced an official apology from the Federal government for the World War II internment program and offered token compensation to victims. He was also instrumental in the designation of Manzanar internment camp as a national historic site and in obtaining land in Washington, D.C. for the memorial to Japanese-American patriotism in World War II.

He was a chairman of the Democratic Congressional Campaign Committee, ranking member of the United States House Committee on Ways and Means, and third-ranking Democrat on the Ways and Means Committee. During his term he was noted for his staunch opposition to privatization of Social Security. He had a mostly liberal voting record having opposed the Defense of Marriage Act, the ban on partial-birth abortions, and the Private Securities and Litigations Reform Act.

In what would be his last election, 2004, he faced Republican Mike Dugas and easily won a 14th term with 71.4% of the vote, compared to Dugas' 23.4%. Opponents Pat Driscoll (Green Party) and John Reiger (Peace and Freedom Party), won 3.4% and 1.8% of the vote, respectively. (DCCC chairs are chosen in part because they are not expected to face serious competition for re-election.)

Personal life
He was married to Doris Okada who, until December 1998, worked as deputy assistant to the President and Deputy Director of Public Liaison for President Bill Clinton, leaving to become senior advisor and director of government relations at the firm of Collier Shannon Scott, PLLC before winning election to her late husband's seat. The Matsuis had one son, Brian, who received his undergraduate and law degree from Stanford University.

Death
On December 24, 2004, Matsui entered Bethesda Naval Hospital with pneumonia. It was a complication from myelodysplastic syndrome, a rare stem cell disorder that causes an inability of the bone marrow to produce blood products, such as red blood cells, white blood cells and platelets. He died of pneumonia on January 1, 2005.

In the special election on March 8 to fill the vacant seat, Matsui's widow Doris won with over 68 percent of the vote; she was sworn in on March 10, 2005.

See also
List of Asian Americans and Pacific Islands Americans in the United States Congress
List of United States Congress members who died in office

References

External links

 Robert T. Matsui Legacy Project Road to Redress and Reparations  at CSU Sacramento
 Campaign finance data from the 2004 election
 Robert T. Matsui Annual Writing Competition at Asian Pacific American Bar Association Educational Fund
 

|-

|-

1941 births
2005 deaths
20th-century American lawyers
20th-century American politicians
21st-century American politicians
American politicians of Japanese descent
Asian-American members of the United States House of Representatives
California lawyers
California politicians of Japanese descent
Deaths from cancer in Maryland
Deaths from myelodysplastic syndrome
Deaths from pneumonia in Maryland
Democratic Party members of the United States House of Representatives from California
Japanese-American internees
Members of the United States Congress of Japanese descent
Sacramento City Council members
Asian-American city council members
University of California, Berkeley alumni
University of California, Hastings College of the Law alumni
Democratic National Committee treasurers